Emory Bemsley Pottle (July 4, 1815 – April 18, 1891) was a U.S. Representative from New York.

Born in Naples, New York, Pottle pursued classical studies at Penn Yan (New York) Academy.

He studied law with the firm of Sibley & Worden in Canandaigua, New York, was admitted to the bar in New York City in 1838 and commenced practice in Springfield, Ohio.  He then returned to Naples and continued the practice of law. He served as a member of the New York State Assembly in 1847.

Pottle had interests in several businesses, including serving as president of the Geneva, Hornellsville, and Pine Creek Railroad, and the Geneva and Southwestern Railroad.  Pottle also raised sheep and maintained vineyards, and he served as president of the New York State Grape Growers Association.

Pottle was elected as a Republican to the Thirty-fifth and Thirty-sixth Congresses (March 4, 1857 – March 3, 1861).
He again resumed the practice of his profession.
He was appointed by President Abraham Lincoln to serve on the commission which prepared a bill providing for a tariff on wool.
He died in Naples on April 18, 1891.
He was interred in Rose Ridge Cemetery.

Sources

1815 births
1891 deaths
People from Naples, New York
Republican Party members of the United States House of Representatives from New York (state)
19th-century American politicians